Donald Burnham Ensenat (born February 4, 1946) is a retired American diplomat. Until his retirement in 2007, he served as United States Chief of Protocol at the United States Department of State.

Personal
Ensenat is a native of New Orleans, Louisiana. He is a graduate of the Isidore Newman School in New Orleans, Yale University, and the Tulane University Law School.  As an undergraduate, he was a roommate of George W. Bush at Yale College. In the 1960s and 1970s, Ensenat served as a military reservist.

Career
Ensenat is a lawyer, and formerly served as Ambassador to Brunei.

External links
 Office of the Chief of Protocol Website
 Photo
 

1946 births
Isidore Newman School alumni
Living people
Tulane University alumni
Tulane University Law School alumni
Ambassadors of the United States to Brunei
Yale College alumni
Chiefs of Protocol of the United States